The Shevchenko Scientific Society is a Ukrainian scientific society devoted to the promotion of scholarly research and publication that was founded in 1873.

Unlike the government-funded National Academy of Sciences of Ukraine, the society is a public organization. It was reestablished in Ukraine in 1989 during fall of the Soviet Union, after being exiled from Ukraine since 1940. The society now has branches in several countries around the globe, such as the United States, Canada, Australia, and France.

The organisation is named after the famous Ukrainian poet, writer, artist, public and political figure, Taras Shevchenko.

History
It was founded in 1873 in Lemberg (today Lviv), at that time the capital of the Austrian crown land of Kingdom of Galicia and Lodomeria, as a literary society devoted to the promotion of Ukrainian language literature initially under the name Shevchenko Society. It was established soon after another cultural society, better known as Prosvita (Enlightenment). At that time any publication in Ukrainian language was prohibited in the Russian-controlled Ukraine (Little Russia), from the beginning it attracted the financial and intellectual support of writers and patrons of Ukrainian background from the Russian Empire. The Shevchenko Scientific Society was created on an idea of a writer Oleksandr Konyskyi and the Shevchenko's contemporary Dmytro Pylchykov with a financial support of Yelyzaveta Myloradovych-Skoropadska.

In 1893, due to the change in its statute the Shevchenko Scientific Society was transformed into a real scholarly multidisciplinary academy of sciences with its periodical the Zapysky NTSh (Notes of the Shevchenko Scientific Society), yet continue to be specialized in the Ukrainian Studies. Throughout most of its history it had three sections: history-philosophical, philological, and mathematically-medical-natural scientific. Under the presidency of the historian, Mykhailo Hrushevsky, it greatly expanded its activities, contributing to both the humanities and the physical sciences, law and medicine, but most specifically once again it concentrated on Ukrainian studies. During this period, one of its most prolific contributors was the poet, folklorist, and literary historian Ivan Franko who headed the philological section. Also during that period the society created several museums, libraries, and archives. By 1914, several hundred volumes of scholarly research and notices had been published by the society including over a hundred volumes of its Zapysky.

The First World War interrupted the society's activities, particularly during the Russian occupation in 1914-1915, when the society's collection of works and its print shop were destroyed. After the war and the Polish-Ukrainian conflict, the West Ukraine belonged to Poland. During that time, the society lost its government subsidies, but managed to carry on a precarious existence. Its major contributors were the literary historians, Vasyl Shchurat, Kyryl Studynsky, and the historian Ivan Krypiakevych. One of the most important projects of the society was the publication of the first general alphabetic encyclopedia in the Ukrainian language.

The Soviet Union annexed the eastern part of the Second Polish Republic including the city of Lviv, which capitulated to the Red Army on 22 September 1939. Upon their occupation of Lviv, the Soviets dissolved the society. Many of its members were arrested and either imprisoned or executed. Among the perished members were such academicians as R. Zubyk, a former Ukrainian minister I. Feshchenko-Chopivsky, a Ukrainian parliamentarian Petro Franko, Kyryl Studynsky, and many others. During the Nazi occupation, the society still was not able to function openly. In 1947, on the initiative of the geographer and one of the major collaborators with Nazi Germany Volodymyr Kubiyovych, it was re-founded as an émigré scholarly society in Munich; the Society's European center was later moved to Paris. Other branches were also founded in New York City (1947), Toronto (1949) and Australia (1950), and throughout the Cold War it functioned as a federation of semi-independent societies.

During its period in emigration, the major project of the society was again an encyclopedia. Under the editorship of Volodymyr Kubiyovych, it published the great Entsyklopediia ukrainoznavstva (Encyclopedia of Ukrainian Studies) consisting of four major series: the Ukrainian-language thematic encyclopedia in three volumes, the Ukrainian-language alphabetic encyclopedia in 11 volumes, the English-language thematic encyclopedia in two volumes, and the English-language alphabetic one in five volumes. The last compilation, published in Canada under the title Encyclopedia of Ukraine, is available on-line.

In 1989, the society was reactivated in the Ukrainian homeland (in Lviv) and once again undertook a large-scale research and publication program. Branches were soon founded in other Ukrainian cities and membership exceeded a thousand, including 125 full voting members.

Presidents

Ukraine
 1873–1885 Kornylo Sushkevych
 1885–1887 Sydir Hromnytsky
 1887–1889 Demian Hladylovych
 1889–1891 Sydir Hromnytsky
 1891–1892 Demian Hladylovych
 1892–1893 Yulian Tselevych
 1893–1897 Oleksander Barvinsky
 1897–1913 Mykhailo Hrushevsky
 1913–1918 Stepan Tomashivsky
 1919–1923 Vasyl Shchurat
 1923–1932 Kyrylo Studynsky
 1932–1935 Volodymyr Levytsky
 1935–1940 Ivan Rakovsky
 1940–1989 Soviet occupation and World War II
 1989–2005 Oleh Romaniv
 2005–2014 Oleh Kupchynsky
 2014–  Roman Kushnir

Europe
 ????–1952 Zenon Kuzela
 1952–1985 Volodymyr Kubiyovych
 1985–1997 Arkadiy Zhukovsky
 1997–1999 Danylo Husar-Struk
 2000–2011 Arkadiy Zhukovsky
 2011–  Stefan Dunikovsky

United States
 1947–1952 Mykola Chubaty
 1952–1969 Roman Smal-Stocki
 1969–1974 Matthew Stachiw
 1974–1977 Osyp Andrushkiv
 1977–1990 Jaroslaw Padoch
 1990–2000 Leonid Rudnytzky
 2000–2006 Larysa Zaleska Onyshkevych
 2006–2012 Orest Popovych
 2012–2018  George G. Grabowicz
 2018–  Halyna Hryn

Canada
 1949–1973 Yevhen Vertyporokh
 1974–1994 Bohdan Stebelsky
 1994–2000 Vladimir Mackiw
 2000–  Daria Darevych

Society press media
Literaturno-naukovy visnyk was published 1898-1906, 1922-1932 in Lviv and 1907–1914, 1917-1919 in Kyiv. The chief editor was Ivan Franko, since 1905 - Mykhailo Hrushevsky.

References
Notes

External links 

  Shevchenko Scientific Society in Encyclopedia of Ukrainian Diaspora(Ukrainian)
Literary Scientific Herald at Encyclopedia of Ukraine 
 Shevchenko Scientific Society at Encyclopedia of Ukraine
Shevchenko Scientific Society 
Shevchenko Scientific Society (English)

 
Organizations established in 1873
Ukrainian studies
1873 establishments in Austria-Hungary
Establishments in the Kingdom of Galicia and Lodomeria